Julian Ricardo Dulican Erosa (born July 31, 1989) is an American mixed martial artist. He currently competes in the Featherweight division of the Ultimate Fighting Championship. Erosa is also a former CageSport Featherweight and Lightweight Champion.

Background
The son of Ricardo and Debbie Erosa, Julian was born in Seattle, Washington but moved to Yakima growing up. Julian has a younger brother, Ricky. Growing up Julian was an avid skateboarder and snowboarder. During his skateboarding years, he frequently got into fights and eventually drifted into mixed martial arts in his late teens. He graduated from Eisenhower High School and followed his mother's footsteps by studying accounting for a couple of years in Central Washington University before dropping out.

Mixed martial arts career

Early career
After going 10–0 as an amateur, Erosa began his professional mixed martial arts career in 2010. He fought primarily in the Pacific Northwest region, mostly in the CageSport promotion. After racking up 7–0 record, he faced Ryan Mulvihill in a rematch for the vacant CageSport Featherweight Championship at CageSport 19 on April 28, 2012. He won the title but was not able to defend it in a match against Drew Brokenshire at CageSport 22 on December 1, 2012.

After losing the title, Erosa went 3–1 before receiving a title shot for the vacant CageSport (in a prevailing collaboration with Super Fight League) Lightweight Championship. He faced Harrison Bevens at SFL America 2 on December 13, 2014 and claimed the title via knockout. Subsequently, he was pitted against Drew Brokenshire in a rematch for the vacant CageSport Featherweight Championship at SFL America 3 on February 21, 2015. He avenged the previous loss and became simultaneous two-division champion via third-round submission.

The Ultimate Fighter
Erosa was then picked to be a part of The Ultimate Fighter: Team McGregor vs. Team Faber, in which he advanced from the preliminary fights by defeating Jason Soares via unanimous decision.

In the elimination round, Erosa faced Mehdi Baghdad. Erosa won the fight via majority decision, advancing into quarter-finals where he took on Abner Lloveras. Erosa advanced to the semi-finals via a split decision victory.

In the semi-finals Erosa met the season's would-be runner-up Artem Lobov. He was eliminated from the tournament via first-round knockout loss.

Ultimate Fighting Championship
Despite being eliminated from the tournament, Erosa signed a contract with the UFC and made his promotional debut against fellow The Ultimate Fighter alumni Marcin Wrzosek at The Ultimate Fighter: Team McGregor vs. Team Faber Finale on December 11, 2015. Erosa won the fight via split decision.

He would then face Teruto Ishihara at UFC 196 on March 5, 2016. Erosa lost the fight via second-round knockout and was subsequently released from the promotion.

Return to Cagesport and Other Organizations

After his release from the UFC, went on to fight at a variety of organizations, including Prime Fighting, where he would win the Featherweight title with a TKO win over Austin Springer, as well as losing to Paddy Pimblett in the Cage Warriors Featherweight title fight, in a highly controversial unanimous decision. He would then return to Cage Sports, where he would win back the Lightweight title and defend it again against Justin Harrington, before losing it in a TKO loss to Bobby McIntyre. He would have a one fight stint GKO, winning his only fight by TKO, before returning to Cagesports and winning back the Lightweight title against Bryan Nuro, in a unanimous decision. He would fight on Dana White's Contender Series 11, and although he won the fight against Jamall Emmers by knockout, he was not offered a UFC contract.

Return to UFC

Although he did not earn a direct contract after his DWCS fight, Erosa was signed to fight against fellow DWCS alumni Devonte Smith at UFC Fight Night: The Korean Zombie vs. Rodríguez. He lost the fight via knockout in round one.

Erosa faced Grant Dawson on March 9, 2019 at UFC Fight Night: Lewis vs. dos Santos. He lost the fight via unanimous decision and was briefly released from the promotion.

Erosa was offered a quick return to face Julio Arce on May 18, 2019 at UFC Fight Night 151, despite being released from the promotion after the previous loss. He lost the fight via knockout in the third round and was released once again.

After the release, Erosa picked up one win in his native CageSport and was brought back as a late replacement for Kyle Nelson, who had visa issues, against Sean Woodson at UFC on ESPN: Poirier vs. Hooker. He won the fight via D'arce choke in the third round. This win earned him the Performance of the Night award.

Erosa faced Nate Landwehr on February 20, 2021 at UFC Fight Night: Blaydes vs. Lewis. He won the fight via technical knockout in round one.

Erosa faced Seung Woo Choi on June 19, 2021 at UFC on ESPN 25. He lost the fight via knockout in the first round.

Erosa replaced Lerone Murphy on short notice against Charles Jourdain on September 4, 2021 at UFC Fight Night 191. He won the fight via a submission in round three.

Erosa faced Steven Peterson on February 5, 2022 at UFC Fight Night 200. At the weigh-ins, Peterson weighed in at 149 pounds, three pounds over the featherweight non-title fight limit. The bout proceeded at catchweight and Peterson was fined 30% of his purse, which will go to his opponent. Erosa won the fight via split decision. 13 out of 18 media scores gave it to Erosa. This fight earned him the Fight of the Night award and also Peterson's bonus due to his weight miss.

Erosa faced Hakeem Dawodu on September 10, 2022 at UFC 279. At the weigh-ins, Dawodu weighed in at 149.5 pounds, 3.5 pounds over the non-title featherweight limit. Dawodu was fined 30% of his purse, which will go to his opponent Erosa. Erosa won the fight via unanimous decision.

Erosa faced Alex Caceres  on December 17, 2022, at UFC Fight Night 216. He lost the fight via technical knockout in round one.

Erosa is scheduled to face Fernando Padilla on April 29, 2023, at UFC Fight Night 223.

Personal life
Erosa has been married to Alaina Evans since mid-2016. He is non-religious.

Championships and accomplishments

Mixed martial arts
Ultimate Fighting Championship
Performance of the Night (One time) 
Fight of the Night (One times) .
CageSport
CageSport Featherweight Champion (two times)
CageSport Lightweight Champion (three times)
One title defense (second reign)
Prime Fighting
Prime Fighting Featherweight Champion (one time)
MMAjunkie.com
2021 Submission of the Month vs. Charles Jourdain

Mixed martial arts record

|-
| Loss 
|align=center|28–10 
|Alex Caceres
|TKO (head kick and punches)
|UFC Fight Night: Cannonier vs. Strickland
| 
|align=center|1
|align=center|3:04
|Las Vegas, Nevada, United States
|
|-
|Win
|align=center|28–9
|Hakeem Dawodu
|Decision (unanimous)
|UFC 279
|
|align=center|3
|align=center|5:00
|Las Vegas, Nevada, United States
|
|-
|Win
|align=center|27–9
|Steven Peterson
|Decision (split)
|UFC Fight Night: Hermansson vs. Strickland
| 
|align=center|3
|align=center|5:00
|Las Vegas, Nevada, United States
|
|-
|Win
|align=center|26–9
|Charles Jourdain
|Submission (D'Arce choke)
|UFC Fight Night: Brunson vs. Till
|
|align=center|3
|align=center|2:56
|Las Vegas, Nevada, United States
|
|-
|Loss
|align=center|25–9
|Seung Woo Choi
|TKO (punches)
|UFC on ESPN: The Korean Zombie vs. Ige
|
|align=center|1
|align=center|1:37
|Las Vegas, Nevada, United States
|
|-
|Win
|align=center|25–8
|Nate Landwehr
|TKO (flying knee)
|UFC Fight Night: Blaydes vs. Lewis
|
|align=center|1
|align=center|0:56
|Las Vegas, Nevada, United States
|
|-
|Win
|align=center|24–8
|Sean Woodson
|Submission (D'Arce choke)
|UFC on ESPN: Poirier vs. Hooker
|
|align="center"|3
|align="center"|2:44
|Las Vegas, Nevada, United States
|
|-
|Win
|align=center|23–8
|AJ Bryant
|Submission (bulldog choke)
|CageSport 60
|
|align="center"|1
|align="center"|4:43
|Tacoma, Washington, United States
|
|-
|Loss
|align=center|22–8
|Julio Arce
|KO (head kick)
|UFC Fight Night: dos Anjos vs. Lee
|
|align="center"|3
|align="center"|1:49
|Rochester, New York, United States
|
|-
|Loss
|align=center|22–7
|Grant Dawson
|Decision (unanimous)
|UFC Fight Night: Lewis vs. dos Santos
|
|align="center"|3
|align="center"|5:00
|Wichita, Kansas, United States
|
|-
|Loss
|align=center|22–6
|Devonte Smith
|KO (punches)
|UFC Fight Night: The Korean Zombie vs. Rodríguez
|
|align="center"|1
|align="center"|0:46
|Denver, Colorado, United States
|
|-
|Win
|align=center|22–5
|Jamall Emmers
|KO (head kick and punches)
|Dana White's Contender Series 11
|
|align="center"|2
|align="center"|1:10
|Las Vegas, Nevada, United States
|
|-
|Win
|align=center|21–5
|Bryan Nuro
|Decision (unanimous)
|CageSport 48
|
|align="center"|5
|align="center"|5:00
|Tacoma, Washington, United States
|
|-
|Win
|align=center|20–5
|Erick Sánchez
|TKO (punches)
|Global Knockout 11
|
|align="center"|3
|align="center"|4:32
|Jackson, California, United States
|
|-
|Loss
|align=center|19–5
|Bobby McIntyre
|TKO (punches)
|CageSport 46
|
|align="center"|1
|align="center"|3:58
|Tacoma, Washington, United States
|
|-
|Win
|align=center|19–4
|Justin Harrington
|KO (knees and punches)
|CageSport 45
|
|align="center"|1
|align="center"|4:09
|Tacoma, Washington, United States
|
|-
|Win
|align=center|18–4
|Justin Harrington
|Submission (triangle choke)
|CageSport 44
|
|align="center"|1
|align="center"|2:23
|Tacoma, Washington, United States
|
|-
|Loss
|align=center|17–4
|Paddy Pimblett
|Decision (unanimous)
|Cage Warriors: Unplugged
|
|align="center"|5
|align="center"|5:00
|London, England
|
|-
|Win
|align=center|17–3
|Austin Springer
|TKO (punches)
|Prime Fighting 8: Springer vs. Erosa
|
|align="center"|2
|align="center"|3:15
|Ridgefield, Washington, United States
|
|-
|Win
|align=center|16–3
|Daniel Swain
|TKO (doctor stoppage)
|KOTC: Battle Zone
|
|align="center"|2
|align="center"|5:00
|Worley, Idaho, United States
|
|-
|Loss
|align=center|15–3
|Teruto Ishihara
|KO (punches)
|UFC 196
|
|align="center"|2
|align="center"|0:34
|Las Vegas, Nevada, United States
|
|-
|Win
|align=center|15–2
|Marcin Wrzosek
|Decision (split)
|The Ultimate Fighter: Team McGregor vs. Team Faber Finale
|
|align="center"|3
|align="center"|5:00
|Las Vegas, Nevada, United States
|
|-
|Win
|align=center|14–2
|Drew Brokenshire
|Submission (brabo choke)
|SFL 37
|
|align="center"|3
|align="center"|4:35
|Tacoma, Washington, United States
|
|-
|Win
|align=center|13–2
|Harrison Bevens
|KO (knee)
|SFL 36
|
|align="center"|2
|align="center"|2:10
|Tacoma, Washington, United States
|
|-
|Win
|align=center|12–2
|Ryan Mulvihill
|Submission (triangle choke)
|KOTC: Seek and Destroy
|
|align="center"|2
|align="center"|4:19
|Worley, Idaho, United States
|
|-
|Win
|align=center|11–2
|Mike Joy
|TKO (punches)
|CageSport 29
|
|align="center"|2
|align="center"|2:28
|Tacoma, Washington, United States
|
|-
|Loss
|align=center|10–2
|Lee Morrison
|Decision (unanimous)
|CageSport 25
|
|align="center"|3
|align="center"|5:00
|Tacoma, Washington, United States
|
|-
|Win
|align=center|10–1
|Jason Gybels
|Submission (triangle choke)
|CageSport 24
|
|align="center"|2
|align="center"|3:49
|Tacoma, Washington, United States
|
|-
|Loss
|align=center|9–1
|Drew Brokenshire
|Decision (unanimous)
|CageSport 22
|
|align="center"|5
|align="center"|5:00
|Fife, Washington, United States
|
|-
|Win
|align=center|9–0
|Jason Gybels
|KO (punch)
|CageSport 21
|
|align="center"|1
|align="center"|4:36
|Fife, Washington, United States
|
|-
|Win
|align=center|8–0
|Ryan Mulvihill
|Submission (armbar)
|CageSport 19
|
|align="center"|4
|align="center"|1:48
|Tacoma, Washington, United States
|
|-
|Win
|align=center|7–0
|Jerome Jones
|Submission (armbar)
|CageSport 18
|
|align="center"|2
|align="center"|4:30
|Tacoma, Washington, United States
|
|-
|Win
|align=center|6–0
|Matt Coble
|Submission (rear-naked choke)
|CageSport 17
|
|align="center"|3
|align="center"|3:31
|Tacoma, Washington, United States
|
|-
|Win
|align=center|5–0
|Ernesto Toscano
|Decision (unanimous)
|CageSport 16
|
|align="center"|3
|align="center"|5:00
|Tacoma, Washington, United States
|
|-
|Win
|align=center|4–0
|John Martinez
|TKO (punches)
|Lords of the Cage
|
|align="center"|3
|align="center"|3:24
|Yakima, Washington, United States
|
|-
|Win
|align=center|3–0
|Ryan Mulvihill
|Submission (brabo choke)
|CageSport 14
|
|align="center"|2
|align="center"|1:23
|Tacoma, Washington, United States
|
|-
|Win
|align=center|2–0
|Omar Avelar
|Submission (armbar)
|CageSport 13
|
|align="center"|2
|align="center"|2:32
|Tacoma, Washington, United States
|
|-
|Win
|align=center|1–0
|Angel Diaz
|KO (punches)
|CageSport 12
|
|align="center"|1
|align="center"|2:16
|Tacoma, Washington, United States
|
|}

|-
|Loss
|align=center|3–1
|Artem Lobov
|TKO (punches)
|rowspan=4|The Ultimate Fighter: Team McGregor vs Team Faber
|
|align=center|1
|align=center|1:00
|rowspan=4|Las Vegas, Nevada, United States
|
|-
|Win
|align=center|3–0
|Abner Lloveras
|Decision (split)
|
|align=center|2
|align=center|5:00
|
|-
|Win
|align=center|2–0
|Mehdi Baghdad
|Decision (majority)
|
|align=center|2
|align=center|5:00
|
|-
|Win
|align=center|1–0
|Jason Soares
|Decision (unanimous)
|
|align=center|2
|align=center|5:00
|
|-

See also
List of male mixed martial artists
List of current UFC fighters

References

External links

1989 births
Living people
Ultimate Fighting Championship male fighters
Welterweight mixed martial artists
American male mixed martial artists
Sportspeople from Yakima, Washington
Mixed martial artists from Washington (state)